Energy in Serbia describes energy and electricity production, consumption and import in Serbia.

History
On 6 October 1893, the first Serbian power plant, located in the Dorćol urban neighborhood of Belgrade, began production of electricity.

In 1900, the first alternating current hydroelectric power plant Pod gradom in Užice on the river Đetinja went online. In 1909, hydroelectric plants Gamzigrad in Zaječar and Sveta Petka in Niš began to build. Two years later, the hydroelectric power station on the river Moravica in Ivanjica was put in the operation.

In Belgrade, the power plant Snaga i Svetlost was built in 1933, being one of the largest in the Balkans at that time.

The establishment of the Električno preduzeće Srbije followed in 1945. Between 1947 and 1950, the hydroelectric power plant Sokolovica and coal power plants Mali Kostolac and Veliki Kostolac, the first power stations to be built in Serbia after the Second World War. In 1952, the underground mining of the coal field Kolubara had started. Four years later, coal power plant RB Kolubara went in operation. A year earlier, the hydroelectric power plants Vlasina and Zvornik have been connected to the power grid. In the period from 1960 to 1967, hydroelectric power plants Bistrica, Kokin Brod and Potpeć were under construction.

In the period from 1942 to 1943, Serbia conducted the first exploration potential of oil field. The first drill hole was made in 1947 in Banat (Velika Greda), and in 1949 founded the company Naftagas.

In 1965, Združeno elektroprivredno preduzeće Srbije was founded. The coal-fired power plant Bajina Bašta began with the production of electricity a year later. The two largest power plants in Serbia, the hydroelectric power plant HPP Đerdap I at the Danube river and the coal power plant TENT, went into operation in 1970. Twelve years later, the pumped storage plant Bajina Bašta was built, and in 1990 the hydroelectric power station Pirot was put into operation.

Electricity

The main producer of electricity in Serbia is Elektroprivreda Srbije. The company has an installed capacity of 7,662 MW and generates 38.9 TWh of electricity per year. Its installed capacity in lignite-fired thermal power plant is 4,390 MW, gas-fired and liquid fuel-fired combined heat and power plants is 336 MW, and hydro power plants is 2,936 MW. EPS is also the largest producer of lignite in Serbia operating in the Kolubara and Kostolac basins, producing around 37 million tonnes per year. Also, 20 MW is generated from wind power, mainly through facilities of MK Fintel Wind.

In order to increase the efficiency of the sector through the action of market mechanisms in the production and supply of electricity, the Serbian government has introduced competition in the electricity sector by adopting the Law on Energy in 2004. All electricity consumers are tariff buyers which are, according to the law, provided by electricity retailer responsible to supply tariff customers within Elektroprivreda Srbije at regulated prices. At the same time buyers who meet the criteria according to the Act is given the opportunity to become a qualified buyer, and thus get the opportunity to purchase electricity on the open market. In the first phase, the electricity market has been open to all potential customers with an annual electricity consumption was above 25 GWh. From 1 January 2007, the Council of the Energy Agency of the Republic of Serbia made decision that the right to acquire the status of an eligible customer is available to all electricity customers with an annual consumption of more than 3 GWh.

Shifting from coal to renewable sources, and therefore the need for new hydro, wind and solar generation plants, is a recognized goal in the Serbian politics. In July 2021 the country's energy and mining minister stated in an interview that the new energy strategy was under preparation, under it up to 50% electricity would be generated from renewable sources by 2040; later in November 2021 she said in another interview that "by 2040 or 2050 (Serbia) should have zero lignite (consumption)" and that such shift would require minimum 17 billion euro investment.

Oil and natural gas

Naftna Industrija Srbije (NIS) is the only company in Serbia which deals with exploration and production of crude oil and gas, as well as with production of geothermal energy. The company disposes with all necessary equipment for the performance of a whole range of complex activities such as geophysical exploration, control of production of crude oil, gas and geothermal energy. The majority of NIS oil fields are located on the territory of Serbia, in Banat region, but upstream has business operations both in Serbia and abroad. In 2011 NIS started to expand business in south-east Europe: in Bosnia and Herzegovina, Romania and Hungary.

The company owns and operates oil refineries in Pančevo (annual capacity 4.8 million tons of crude oil) and Novi Sad (annual capacity 2.6 million tons of crude oil), and natural gas refinery in Elemir. NIS refining complex produces a whole range of petroleum products - from motor gasoline and diesel fuel to mechanical lube oils and feedstock for the petrochemical industry, heavy fuel oil, road and industrial bitumen, etc.

Srbijagas, public gas company, operates the natural gas transportation system which comprise 3,177 kilometers of trunk and regional natural gas pipelines and a 450 million cubic meter underground gas storage facility at Banatski Dvor.

Refined petroleum products - production:

Oil - production:

Oil - consumption:
 (2011)

Oil - proved reserves:
 (1 January 2006)

Natural gas - production:
557 million cubic metres (2012)

Natural gas - consumption:
2.84 billion cubic metres (2012)

Renewable energy

Installed capacity of hydro power is 2,835 MW and as of December 2019. wind power capacity is 500 MW. Serbia also makes use of geothermal and solar energy, currently 27% of Serbia's electricity comes from hydro while 4% comes from other renewables. Additional 600 MW of wind capacity is planned by 2030.

See also
 List of power stations in Serbia
 Energy use
 Energy Community

References